The Free and Open Source Silicon Foundation (FOSSi Foundation) is a non-profit foundation with the mission to promote and assist free and open digital hardware designs and their related ecosystems. It was set up by the core OpenRISC development team in response to decreasing support from the commercial owners of the opencores.org website. The main sponsor of the FOSSi Foundation is Google and past sponsors included Cadence Design Systems and Embecosm. The FOSSi Foundation should not be confused with the Free Silicon Foundation.

The FOSSi Foundation operates as an open, inclusive, vendor-independent group. It identifies its mission as the following activities:
 support and promote open standards development and their use;
 support community events and organize regular events;
 encourage industry participation in open source IP design;
 assist hobbyists and academic institutions with opening their work to the public; and
 support the development and maintenance of a web site, aimed at providing a platform for free and open source silicon.

The FOSSi Foundation is the legal entity, owner of the librecores.org website, the primary portal for the user community. It holds an annual conference (ORConf) and organizes an annual student design contest.

To provide a harassment-free environment for minority contributors, all community members are required to abide by a code of conduct which prohibits offensive language and unwanted behavior in any of the community spaces.

History 
During 2015, ORSoC AB, commercial owners of opencores.org formed a joint venture with KNCMiner AB to develop bitcoin mining machines. As this became the primary focus of the business, they spent less time on the opencores.org project. In response to the growing lack of commitment, the core OpenRISC development team set up the Free and Open Source Silicon Foundation (FOSSi), and registered the LibreCores website, as the basis for all future development, independent of commercial control.

In 2016, the LibreCores development is intensifying and the annual "LibreCores Student Design Contest" was announced The FOSSi Foundation is an umbrella organization in the Google Summer of Code 2016–2020.

See also
 Open content
 Free content
 OpenCores
 Open-source hardware

References

External links
 
 User portal: LibreCores
 Conference portal: ORConf

British companies established in 2015
Community interest companies
Open-source hardware